Gug Tappeh (also Romanized as Gūg Tappeh; also known as Goy Tappeh and Gūy Tappeh) is a village in Baranduzchay-ye Shomali Rural District of the Central District of Urmia County, West Azerbaijan province, Iran. At the 2006 National Census, its population was 1,804 in 482 households. The following census in 2011 counted 2,439 people in 706 households. The latest census in 2016 showed a population of 2,850 people in 836 households; it was the largest village in its rural district.

Notable people
 Malek-Yonan family
 George Malek-Yonan
 Rosie Malek-Yonan
 Terrence Malick

Gallery

See also
 Assyrians in Iran
 List of Assyrian settlements

References 

Urmia County

Populated places in West Azerbaijan Province

Populated places in Urmia County

Assyrian settlements